Elizabeth Nunez is a Trinidadian American novelist and Distinguished Professor of English at Hunter College–CUNY, New York City.

Her novels have won a number of awards: Prospero's Daughter received the New York Times Editors' Choice and 2006 Novel of the Year from Black Issues Book Review, Bruised Hibiscus won the 2001 American Book Award, and Beyond the Limbo Silence won the 1999 Independent Publishers Book Award. In addition, Nunez was shortlisted for the Hurston/Wright Legacy Award for Discretion; Boundaries was selected as a New York Times Editors' Choice and nominated for a 2012 NAACP Image Award; and Anna In-Between was selected for the 2010 PEN Oakland Josephine Miles Award for literary excellence as well as a New York Times Editors' Choice, and received starred reviews from Publishers Weekly, Booklist, and Library Journal. Nunez is a contributor to the 2019 anthology New Daughters of Africa edited by Margaret Busby.

Biography

Early life
Nunez began writing as early as nine years of age  and won the first-place prize for the "Tiny Tots" writing contest in the Trinidad Guardian. She emigrated from Trinidad to the United States after completing high school at the age of 19 in 1963.

Career overview

Having arrived in the United States aged 19, Nunez earned a BA in English from Marian College in Fond du Lac, Wisconsin, and an MA and PhD in Literature from New York University. She began teaching at Medgar Evers College in 1972, a year after the college was established, and was instrumental in developing its writing curriculum. She is a Distinguished Professor at Hunter College, where she teaches courses on Caribbean Women Writers and Creative Writing. The author of eight novels, she is also co-editor with Jennifer Sparrow of Stories from Blue Latitudes: Caribbean Women Writers at Home and Abroad, co-editor with Brenda Greene of the collection of essays Black Writers in the 90's, and author of several monographs of literary criticism. Her memoir "Discovering my Mother" was published in the 2019 anthology New Daughters of Africa edited by Margaret Busby.

In addition to developing her writing and teaching career, Nunez has developed programming to support other writers of color. She is the co-founder of the National Black Writers Conference, which received funding from the National Endowment for the Humanities, The Nathan Cummings Foundation, and the Reed Foundation under her direction as its co-director from 1986 to 2000. Nunez also hosts a radio program on WBAI 99.5FM and chair of the PEN American Open Book Committee.

Nunez was also the Executive Producer of the 2004 NY Emmy-nominated CUNY TV series Black Writers in America.

Novels
 When Rocks Dance (1986)
 Beyond The Limbo Silence (1998)
 Bruised Hibiscus (2000)
 Discretion (2002)
 Grace (2003)
 Prospero's Daughter (2006)
 Anna In Between (2010)
 Boundaries (2011)
 Not for Everyday Use (2014)
 Even in Paradise (2016)
 Now Lila Knows (2022)

References

External links

 

Trinidad and Tobago emigrants to the United States
New York University alumni
American academics of English literature
City University of New York faculty
Year of birth missing (living people)
Living people
Trinidad and Tobago women novelists
Trinidad and Tobago novelists
20th-century American novelists
21st-century American novelists
American women novelists
20th-century American women writers
21st-century American women writers
PEN Oakland/Josephine Miles Literary Award winners
American Book Award winners
Novelists from New York (state)
American women non-fiction writers
20th-century American non-fiction writers
21st-century American non-fiction writers
American women academics